The Seddon Mayfly was a  tandem biplane of unusual construction. It was designed by Royal Navy Lieutenant John W. Seddon and A. G. Hackett  and built by Accles & Pollock.  When built it was the largest aeroplane in the world, but it failed to fly when tested.

Design and development
Design  of the Seddon Mayfly began in 1908, with the intention of attempting to win the prize for a flight between Manchester and London given by the Daily Mail. The design was based on a paper model, and Seddon took leave from the Navy to design and build and test the aircraft. Control surfaces consisted of a forward-mounted biplane elevators and a pair of diamond-shaped rudders mounted between each set of wings. The aircraft was intended to carry five passengers in addition to the pilot.   

It was powered by a pair of  N.E.C. water-cooled engines mounted side by side between the two sets of wings.  Each drove a single Beedle type tractor propeller.  These were made of sheet aluminium, with the semi-circular blades supported at the ends by attachment to a radial tube.

It was tested at the Midland Aero Club grounds at Dunstall Park near Wolverhampton but damaged an axle and failed to leave the ground. It was eventually taken apart by souvenir hunters.

Specifications

References 

Bibliography

Lewis, P., British Aircraft 1809-1914. London: Putnam, 1962
 Winchester, Jim. The World's Worst Aircraft. United States, NY: Metro Books, 2005. 

Biplanes
1910s British aircraft
Tandem-wing aircraft
Twin-engined tractor aircraft